Itokawa (written:  lit. "thread river") is a Japanese surname. Notable people with the surname include:

, Japanese rocket scientist
, Japanese politician of the People's New Party
, Japanese shot putter
, Japanese speed skater

See also
25143 Itokawa, an asteroid named after Hideo Itokawa

Japanese-language surnames